This is a list of streams and rivers in the U.S. state of Florida. With one exception, the streams and rivers of Florida all originate on the Coastal plain. That exception is the Apalachicola River, which is formed by the merger of the Chattahoochee River, which originates in the Appalachian Mountains, and the Flint River, which originates in the Piedmont. Most streams and rivers in Florida start from swamps, while some originate from springs or lakes. Many of the streams and rivers are underground for part of their courses. The Everglades, sometimes called the "river of grass", is a very wide and shallow river that originates from Lake Okeechobee. Most of Florida's streams and rivers drain into the Gulf of Mexico. Drainage on the east coast of Florida is dominated by the St. Johns River, which, with the swamps that form its headwaters, extends parallel to the coast from inland of Fort Pierce to Jacksonville.

By drainage basin

Atlantic coast

Rivers are listed as they enter the ocean from north to south.  Tributaries are listed as they enter their main stem from downstream to upstream.
St. Marys River
Amelia River
Bells River
Nassau River
South Amelia River
Thomas Creek
Fort George River
St. Johns River – Juniper Springs, Salt Springs, Silver Glen Springs, Alexander Springs, Blue Spring, Beecher Spring
Pablo Creek
Sisters Creek
Broward River
Trout River
Ribault River
Little Trout River
Arlington River
Pottsburg Creek
Ortega River
Cedar River
Doctors Lake
Julington Creek
Black Creek
North Fork Black Creek
Lake Kingsley
Yellow Water Creek
South Fork Black Creek
Rice Creek
Etonia Creek
Dunns Creek
Ocklawaha River
Orange Creek
Little Orange Creek
Orange Lake
Cross Creek
Lochloosa Lake
Lochloosa Creek
Prairie Creek-Camp Canal-River Styx
Newnans Lake
Silver River
Lake Griffin
Yale Canal
Lake Yale
Haines Creek
Lake Eustis
Dora Canal
Lake Dora
Lake Beauclair
Apopka-Beauclair Canal
Lake Apopka
Dead River
Lake Harris
Palatlakaha River
Salt Springs River
Alexander Springs Creek
Hontoon Dead River
Wekiva River – Wekiwa Springs
Blackwater Creek
Little Wekiva River
Lake Jesup 
Econlockhatchee River
Little Econlockhatchee River
Matanzas River
Tolomato River
San Sebastian River
Halifax River
Spruce Creek
Tomoka River
Indian River North
Indian River
Banana River
Eau Gallie River
Elbow Creek
Crane Creek
Turkey Creek
Saint Sebastian River
St. Lucie River
Loxahatchee River
Hillsboro River
Stranahan River
New River (Broward County)
Middle River
Oleta River
Little River
Miami River
Wagner Creek
Snapper Creek

Alachua Sink
Water enters Paynes Prairie Basin from a number of sources. Historically it drained only into Alachua Sink. Water entering the Alachua Sink flows into the Floridan aquifer. (Various sources stating that water entering the Alachua Sink flows to the Santa Fe River may be based on a story told by a Seminole guide to a white explorer in 1823, that a Seminole who had drowned in the sink was later found in the river.) In 1927, Camps Canal was built, which linked the basin to the Orange Lake through the River Styx and ultimately to the Atlantic Ocean.

Bivens Arm
Tumbling Creek
Little Tumbling Creek
Sweetwater Branch
Prairie Creek
Newnans Lake
Hatchet Creek
Lake Forest Creek
Little Hatchet Creek
Chacala Run
Chacala Pond
Sawgrass Run
Sawgrass Pond
Lake Wauburg
Georges Pond
Burnt Pond
Dog Branch

Lake Okeechobee
Lake Okeechobee drains into the Atlantic Ocean via the St. Lucie River, the West Palm Beach Canal, the Hillsboro Canal, the North New River Canal, and the Miami Canal, and into the Gulf of Mexico via the Caloosahatchee Canal which connects to the head of the Caloosahatchee River.
The major input of water into Lake Okeechobee comes from the north, via the Kissimmee River. Rivers are listed as they enter Lake Okeechobee from west to east. Tributaries are listed as they enter their main stem from downstream to upstream.

 Fisheating Creek
 Indian Prairie Canal
 Lake Istokpoga
 Kissimmee River
 Istokpoga Creek
 Lake Istokpoga
 Arbuckle Creek
 Josephine Creek
 Jackson Canal
 Zipprer Canal
 Lake Rosalie
 Weohykapha Creek
 Jackson Canal
 Lake Kissimmee
 C-37 canal
 Lake Hatchineha
 Catfish Creek 
 Lake Marion Creek
 Snell Creek
 Reedy Creek
 C-36 canal
 Cypress Lake (Florida)
 Dead River
 C-34 canal
 C-35 canal
 Lake Tohopekaliga
 Shingle Creek
 C-31 canal
 East Lake Tohopekaliga
Boggy Creek
 Taylor Creek
 Mosquito Creek
 Henry Creek
 Lettuce Creek

Gulf coast

Rivers are listed as they enter the gulf from south to north, then west. Tributaries are listed as they enter their main stem from downstream to upstream.
Joe River
Shark River
Harney River
Broad River
Rodgers River
Lostmans River
Chatham River
Huston River
Lopez River
New River in Collier County
Turner River
Barron River
Fakahatchee River
Whitney River
Big Marco River
Henderson Creek
Cocohatchee River
Imperial River
Estero River
Caloosahatchee River
Billy Creek
Orange River
Peace River
Horse Creek
Shell Creek
Myakka River
Myakkahatchee Creek
Manatee River
Wares Creek
Braden River
Cooper Creek
Little Manatee River
Alafia River – Buckhorn Spring, Lithia Springs
Palm River
Hillsborough River – Crystal Springs
New River in Pasco County
Anclote River
Pithlachascotee River
Weeki Wachee River – Weeki Wachee Springs
Chassahowitzka River
Homosassa River – Homosassa Springs 
Crystal River
Withlacoochee River (central Florida)
Rainbow River – Rainbow Springs 
Little Withlacoochee River
Waccasassa River
Wekiva River (Gulf Hammock, Levy County)
Suwannee River – Suwannee Springs, Hart Springs, Ginnie Springs, Fanning Springs, Manatee  Springs, Otter Springs, Troy Spring 
Santa Fe River 
Ichetucknee River – Ichetucknee Springs 
New River
Withlacoochee River (north Florida) – Madison Blue Springs  
Alapaha River – Alapaha Rise Spring
Alapahoochee River
Steinhatchee River
Fenholloway River
Econfina River
Aucilla River – Nutall Rise
Wacissa River – Wacissa Springs, Aucilla Spring, 
Pinhook River
St. Marks River – St. Marks Spring
East River
Wakulla River – Wakulla Springs
Ochlockonee River
Sopchoppy River
Telogia Creek
Little River
Crooked River
Carrabelle River
New River
Apalachicola River
Jackson River
Chipola River – Baltzell Spring, Blue Hole Spring
Chattahoochee River
Econfina Creek
Choctawhatchee River – Vortex Spring
Pea River
East Bay River
Yellow River
Shoal River
Blackwater River
Escambia River
Perdido River

Alphabetically

Alafia River
Alapaha River
Alapahoochee River
Alexander Springs Creek
Amelia River
Anclote River
Apalachicola River
Arlington River
Aucilla River
Banana River
Barron River
Bells River
Big Marco River
Billy Creek
Black Creek
Blackwater River
Bonnet Creek
Braden River
Broad River
Broward River
Caloosahatchee River
Carrabelle River
Cedar River
Chassahowitzka River  
Chatham River
Chattahoochee River
Chipola River 
Choctawhatchee River
Cocohatchee River
Crane Creek
Crooked River
Cross Creek
Crystal River
Cypress Creek
Dead River (Kissimmee River tributary)
Dead River (Lake County, Florida)
Doctors Lake
Dunns Creek
East Bay River
East River
Eau Gallie River
Econfina Creek
Econfina River
Econlockhatchee River
Elbow Creek
Escambia River
Estero River
Fakahatchee River
Fenholloway River
Fisheating Creek
Fort George River
Haines Creek
Halifax River
Harney River
Henderson Creek
Hillsboro River
Hillsborough River
Homosassa River
Hontoon Dead River
Huston River
Ichetucknee River
Imperial River
Indian River
Indian River North
Istokpoga Creek
Jackson River
Joe River
Julington Creek
Kissimmee River
Lake Jesup
Lake Marion Creek
Little Econlockhatchee River
Little Manatee River
Little River (Biscayne Bay)
Little River (Ochlockonee River tributary)
Little Trout River
Little Wekiva River
Little Withlacoochee River
Lopez River
Lostmans River
Loxahatchee River
Manatee River
Matanzas River
Miami River
Middle River
Myakka River
Myakkahatchee Creek
Nassau River
New River (Broward County)
New River (Collier County)
New River (Franklin County)
New River (Pasco County)
New River (Union/Bradford County)
Ochlockonee River
Ocklawaha River
Oleta River
Orange Creek
Orange River
Ortega River
Pablo Creek
Palatlakaha River
Palm River
Pea River
Peace River
Perdido River
Pinhook River
Pithlachascotee River
Pottsburg Creek
Rainbow River
Reedy Creek
Ribault River
Rice Creek
Rodgers River
Saint Sebastian River
Salt Springs River
San Sebastian River
Santa Fe River
Shark River
Shell Creek
Shingle Creek
Shoal River
Sisters Creek
Snell Creek
Sopchoppy River
South Amelia River
Spruce Creek
St. Johns River
St. Lucie River
St. Marks River
St. Marys River
Steinhatchee River
Stranahan River
Suwannee River
Taylor Creek
Telogia Creek
Thomas Creek
Tolomato River
Tomoka River
Trout River
Turkey Creek
Turner River
Waccasassa River
Wacissa River
Wakulla River
Weeki Wachee River
Wekiva River (Gulf Hammock)
Wekiva River
Whitney River
Whittenhorse Creek
Withlacoochee River (central Florida)
Withlacoochee River (north Florida)
Yellow River

See also

 Geology of Florida

 List of rivers in the United States
 List of springs in Florida
 Outstanding Florida Waters

References

Fernald, Edward A., Ed. 1981. Drainage Basins and Divides. Atlas of Florida. Tallahassee, Florida: The Florida State University Foundation, Inc. p. 18.

External links
 FloridaRivers.org

Florida rivers
 
Rivers